Stewart Marshall may refer to:
J. Stewart Marshall (1911-1992), Canadian physicist and meteorologist
 Stewart Marshall (athlete), competitor in 2016 World Masters Athletics Championships Men